Colin Fletcher (born 22 February 1953) is a Jamaican cricketer. He played in fourteen first-class and nine List A matches for the Jamaican cricket team from 1978 to 1983.

See also
 List of Jamaican representative cricketers

References

External links
 

1953 births
Living people
Jamaican cricketers
Jamaica cricketers
Cricketers from Kingston, Jamaica